Federal Highway 28 (Fed. 28) is a toll-free part of the federal highway corridors.

References

028